Joseph Rothrock House is a historic home located in West Chester, Chester County, Pennsylvania. It was built in 1858–59, and consists if a -story, three-bay main section with a -story gabled ell in the Gothic style. Later additions have been made to the ell. It is constructed of brick and features a full-width front verandah.

It was listed on the National Register of Historic Places in 1984.

References

West Chester, Pennsylvania
Houses on the National Register of Historic Places in Pennsylvania
Gothic Revival architecture in Pennsylvania
Houses completed in 1859
Houses in Chester County, Pennsylvania
National Register of Historic Places in Chester County, Pennsylvania
1859 establishments in Pennsylvania